In publishing, a slush pile is a set of unsolicited query letters or manuscripts that have either been directly sent to a publisher by an author, or which have been delivered via a literary agent representing the author who may or may not be familiar to the publisher. The responsibility of sifting through slush piles is usually reserved either to editor assistants or to outside contractors called publisher's readers or "first readers". If the reader finds something of interest and can convince a senior editor to accept it, they may earn credit.

But Jean Hannah Edelstein said in one of her articles about the slush pile that initially you enjoy the job of opening the letters, but later you find it an arduous and tedious job. 

Most agents and major publishing houses do not accept unsolicited manuscripts and slush piles are on average usually regarded as undesirable in many literary circles due to the large number of both aspiring and former writers who often produce content of unsatisfactory quality. However, this is not always the case with many smaller publishers or independent editors who are often open to both inexperienced and formerly established writers—both of whom may be able to create original content for the publisher and potentially turn a profit.

In 2008, HarperCollins introduced a website, authonomy, to manage and exploit the slush pile from a web-based perspective, but it was closed in 2015 because writers were gaming the system. Website Youwriteon acts as a slush pile filter for Random House, Orion Publishing Group and Bloomsbury Publishing.

References 

Publishing
Literary terminology